Halcyon is a genus of the tree kingfishers, near passerine birds in the subfamily Halcyoninae.

Taxonomy
The genus Halcyon was introduced by the English naturalist and artist William John Swainson in 1821. He named the type species as the woodland kingfisher (Halcyon senegalensis).

"Halcyon" is a name for a bird in Greek legend generally associated with the kingfisher. There was an ancient belief that the bird nested on the sea, which it calmed in order to lay its eggs on a floating nest. Two weeks of calm weather were therefore expected around the winter solstice. This myth leads to the use of halcyon as a term for peace or calmness.

The genus contains 12 species:

However, other sources, including Fry & Fry, lump the genera Pelargopsis, Syma and Todirhamphus into Halcyon to make a much larger grouping.

Geographic distribution
The genus Halcyon in the current sense consists mainly of species resident in sub-Saharan Africa, with a couple of representatives in southern Asia, one of which, the white-throated kingfisher, occasionally reaches Europe. White-throated and ruddy kingfishers are at least partially migratory.

Habitat
Halcyon kingfishers are mostly large birds with heavy bills. They occur in a variety of habitats, with woodland of various types the preferred environment for most. They are “sit and wait” predators of small ground animals including large insects, rodents, snakes, and frogs, but some will also take fish.

References

Sources
 Fry, K & Fry, H.C. (2000): Kingfishers, Bee-eaters and Rollers. .

External links